Abbottsville is an unincorporated community in Darke County, in the U.S. state of Ohio.

History
A post office called Abbottsville was established in 1848, and remained in operation until 1854. The community was named for one proprietor named Mr. Abbott. The Abbottsville Cemetery is located there.

References

Unincorporated communities in Darke County, Ohio
Unincorporated communities in Ohio